Bill Neil is an American visual effects artist. He was nominated for an Academy Award in the category Best Visual Effects for the film Poltergeist II: The Other Side.

Selected filmography 
 Poltergeist II: The Other Side (1986; co-nominated with Richard Edlund, John Bruno and Garry Waller)
 Dick Tracy (1990)

References

External links 

Living people
Place of birth missing (living people)
Year of birth missing (living people)
Visual effects artists
Visual effects supervisors